Jamil Merrell (born May 9, 1990) is an American football defensive lineman who is currently a free agent. He played college football at Rutgers University and attended Hodgson Vo-Tech High School in Newark, Delaware. He has also been a member of the Chicago Bears and Los Angeles KISS.

Early life
Merrell attended Hodgson Vo-Tech High School, where he played with his twin brother Jamal.

College career
Merrell played for the Rutgers Scarlet Knights from 2009 to 2013.

Professional career

Brooklyn Bolts
After attended a tryout for the Chicago Bears, Merrell signed with the Brooklyn Bolts of the Fall Experimental Football League.

Chicago Bears
In late November 2014, the Bears signed Merrell to the practice squad.

Los Angeles KISS
Merrell was assigned to the Los Angeles KISS of the Arena Football League for the 2016 season.

Colorado Crush
On November 17, 2016, Merrell signed with the Colorado Crush. On March 15, 2016, Merrell was placed on season-ending injured reserve.

References

External links
 Rutgers Scarlet Knights bio

Living people
1990 births
Players of American football from Minnesota
American football defensive linemen
Rutgers Scarlet Knights football players
Brooklyn Bolts players
Chicago Bears players
Los Angeles Kiss players
Colorado Crush (IFL) players